Una prostituta al servizio del pubblico e in regola con le leggi dello stato (literally "A prostitute serving the public and complying with the laws of the state", also known as Prostitution Italian Style) is a 1970  Italian comedy-drama film written and directed by Italo Zingarelli.

For her performance Giovanna Ralli won the Grolla d'oro for best actress.

Cast 
 Giovanna Ralli: Oslavia 
 Giancarlo Giannini: Walter 
 Jean-Marc Bory: François Coly 
 Denise Bataille 
 Paolo Bonacelli 
 Roberto Chevalier

References

External links

1970 films
Commedia all'italiana
Films directed by Italo Zingarelli
Italian comedy-drama films
Films about prostitution in Italy
1970 comedy-drama films
1970s Italian films